Miguel Ignacio Mendoza Donatti (born 22 August 1983), better known as Nacho, is a Venezuelan singer and political activist. Born in Lechería, Anzoátegui, Venezuela. Currently lives in Miami, Florida, United States. He is a member of the duo Chino & Nacho.

Biography 
Nacho was born in the state of Anzoátegui, Venezuela, in Lechería, although he was raised in the city of Maracaibo, state of Zulia. He studied at the U.S.P María Auxiliadora, located in the Municipality Santa Rita and Social Communication, two years of Law and Electronic Engineering. Prior to debuting as part of the duet Chino & Nacho, he was part of the Calle Ciega group. He was also part of projects Los Niños del Swing, Equilibrio and the Venevisión Reality Show "Generación S".

Career

2007–17; 2020-present: Chino & Nacho 

He later on formed the duo Chino & Nacho gaining fame as a Latin artist. Notable songs by the duo included singles "Mi niña bonita", "Tu angelito", "Lo que no sabés tú", "El poeta", "Regálame un muac", "Bebé bonita", "Me voy enamorando" (with Farruko) and "Andas en mi cabeza" (featuring Daddy Yankee). The duo's "Radio Universo Tour" included more than 80 concerts in many countries including a gig at Madison Square Garden and American Airlines Arena. In 2010, the group won a Latin Grammy for Best Urban Album for Mi Niña Bonita.

2017–present: Solo 
In March 2017, Chino & Nacho announced that they would take a break as a duo. Nacho confessed that the desire to spend more time with his family was the main reason for the decision. "We were going to make more than 160 annual dates and there was a point where I began to regulate those trips so that they were less than 15 days, because I felt that I was abandoning my children, my wife".

Nacho signed with the record label Universal Music Group, to continue his solo career. In addition, he signed an agreement as a music executive, to help in the search for new talents and to give them the opportunity to make themselves known.

On 14 April 2017, the music video of his first single as a soloist, titled "Báilame", was made public, reaching a million hits a day after its release.

In 2019, he divorced his wife and started dating Melany Mille with whom he is expecting a child.

Discography

Albums

Singles

As lead artist

As featured artist

Footnotes

References 

1983 births
Living people
People from Anzoátegui
21st-century Venezuelan male singers
Latin pop singers
Venezuelan television personalities
Venezuelan expatriates in the United States
Venezuelan rappers
Venezuelan reggaeton musicians
Universal Music Latin Entertainment artists